The lesser-known Arch of Titus was a triple bay arch erected at the eastern end of the Circus Maximus by the Senate in A.D. 81, in honour of Titus and his capture of Jerusalem in the First Jewish–Roman War. Few traces remain. The inscription (CIL 19151=ILS 264), quoted by an 8th-century Swiss monk known only as the "Einsiedeln Anonymous", makes it clear that this was Titus' triumphal arch. Sculptural fragments of a military frieze have been attributed to the arch.

Architectural and epigraphic fragments of the now lost arch were rediscovered during excavations in 2015.

Further reading

 Steinby, Eva Margareta (ed.), Lexicon Topographicum Urbis Romae, Rome, vol. 1 (1993), p. 108, 274. fig 159
 Die Einsiedler Inschriftensammlung und der Pilgerführer durch Rom (Codex Einsidlensis 326), ed. G. Walser, Stuttgart 1987, p. 87 no. 29
 Fergus Millar, Last Year in Jerusalem: Monuments of the Jewish War in Rome, Flavius Josephus and Flavian Rome J. C. Edmondson, Steve Mason, J. B. Rives (eds.), pp. 101–128
 Brandizzi Vittucci, Paola, L’Arco di Tito al Circo Massimo, Archeologia Laziale 10, Quaderni di archeologia Etrusco-Italica, 19, 1990, pp. 68–71
 M. Canciani, C. Falcolini, Marzia Buonfiglio, S. Pergola, Mauro Saccone, B. Mammì, Giovanni Romito, A Method for Virtual Anastylosis: The Case of the Arch of Titus at the Circus Maximus in Rome, ISPRS Annals of the Photogrammetry, Remote Sensing and Spatial Information Sciences, Volume II-5/W1, 2013, pp. 61–66
 M. Canciani, C. Falcolini, M. Buonfiglio, S. Pergola, M. Saccone, B. Mammì, G. Romito, Virtual Anastylosis of the Arch of Titus at Circus Maximus in Rome. International Journal of Heritage in the Digital Era 3(2), 2014, pp. 393–412
 Stefania Pergola, Circo Massimo. Considerazioni sulla decorazione architettonica dell'Arco di Tito, Bullettino della Commissione Archeologica Comunale di Roma,  2017
 Marialetizia uonfiglio, * Relazione preliminare sulle nuove acquisizioni sul Circo Massimo: indagini archeologiche 2009-2016,  La glòria del Circ. Curses de carros i competicions circenses, Actes 3rd Congrés Internacional d’Arqueologia I Mòn antic, Tarraco Biennal, (Tarraco 16-19 nov. 2016), 2017
 Marialetizia uonfiglio, L'Arco di Tito al Circo Massimo. Dalle indagini archeologiche alla ricostruzione virtuale, Bulletin of the Municipal Archaeological Commission of Rome, 2017
 Stefania Pergola, La decorazione architettonica e scultorea dell'arco di Tito al Circo Massimo, Tarraco, 2017

See also
List of Roman triumphal arches
List of ancient monuments in Rome

References

Titus
Building projects of the Flavian dynasty
1st-century establishments in Italy
80s establishments in the Roman Empire